Shamim or Shameem (Bengali: শামীম, Urdu: شمیم) may refer to
Shamim (name)
Shamim Reza Rubel murder in Bangladesh
Mr. Shamim, a 2014 Pakistani sitcom drama series 
Baalshamin, a Northwest Semitic god and a title

See also
 Shammi (disambiguation)